Mere is a market town and civil parish in Wiltshire, England. It lies at the extreme southwestern tip of Salisbury Plain, close to the borders of Somerset and Dorset. The parish includes the hamlets of Barrow Street, Burton, Charnage, Limpers Hill, Rook Street and Southbrook.

The A303 trunk road passed through Mere until a bypass was built on the northern edge of the town in 1976.

There is an old market square (although markets have not been held for several years), a chiming town clock and a large 15th-century parish church. The steep slope of Castle Hill rises from the northwestern side of Mere. Local industry and commerce includes the Hill Brush company, large wholesale plant nurseries and Yapp's wine merchants.

History
Evidence of prehistoric activity in the area is provided by bowl barrows, including four on Long Hill, overlooking the town. On the northwestern boundary of the parish is Whitesheet Hill, with barrows and an Iron Age hill fort, White Sheet camp. A burial dating from either the 7th or 8th has been found in the town.

Mere had a church from the end of the 12th century. The Earl of Cornwall built Mere Castle on a hill which is connected to Long Hill, overlooking the town, in the mid-13th century. The castle was abandoned in the 14th century and today only earthworks remain. The Duchy of Cornwall still owns much land in the area.

Mere Down, north of the town, has medieval Strip lynchets.

Governance 
The civil parish elects a town council. It is in the area of Wiltshire Council unitary authority, which performs most significant local government functions.

An electoral ward with the same name exists. The ward starts in the east at West Knoyle, stretches through Mere, continues to Zeals and finishes in the northwest at Kilmington. The population of the ward taken from the 2011 census was 4,285.

Religious sites

Parish church 

The Anglican church of St Michael the Archangel is from the 13th, 14th and 15th centuries, and contains remnants from an earlier building. Pevsner describes the church and its furnishings in considerable detail. The church has a  tower with eight bells and is unusual in that it has 10 misericords; those on the south side of the choir date from the 15th century, whilst those on the north side are early 20th century. Restoration in 1856 was by T.H. Wyatt. In 1966 the church was designated as Grade I listed.

The benefice was combined with West Knoyle in 1929, and Maiden Bradley in 1976, forming the parish of Mere with West Knoyle and Maiden Bradley.

Others 
Mere Methodist Church was built as a Primitive Methodist chapel in 1846; a gallery was added in 1859 and a schoolroom in 1874. It was de-consecrated in 2017 and sold at auction in April 2018. It is currently being converted for residential use.

Mere United Reformed Church was built in 1868 as a Congregational chapel, joining the United Reformed Church at its formation in 1972. Precursors of the present building were a small Presbyterian chapel of 1700, an Independent chapel of 1795 and a larger chapel of 1852.

It was a mission church, served by the clergy of St Michael's. The church closed in 2004 and was sold for residential use in 2008.

St Mary's Roman Catholic church was built in 1946 after the community purchased a surplus Nissen hut.

Notable buildings 

Buildings designated as Grade II* are the Old Ship Hotel, formerly a house dated 1711, later the Ship Inn; the Chantry, a 15th-century house for chantry priests; and Dewes House, 17th century.

Schools 
The town has a primary school.

The present school was opened in 1965 at a new site, on Duchy land, as Duchy Manor Secondary School. Accommodation for younger children was added on the same site in 1992 and in 2004 the whole premises became the primary school. Earlier schools were, firstly, the British School, founded c. 1830 and from 1852 housed in the schoolroom under the new Congregational chapel, later taking over the whole building when the larger adjacent chapel was built in 1868. Secondly, the National School, opened near St Michael's in 1840, extended 1864, and augmented in 1899 by the adjacent Grove Building which was funded by Miss Julia Chafyn Grove of Zeals House. The schools amalgamated in 1922 and continued on the same sites as Mere First School (until 1992) and Mere Senior School, later Junior School (until 1972).

Amenities
The town's library and museum are housed in the 1839 National School building, which was converted in 1970.

The town centre has three pubs, the George Inn and the Butt of Sherry. The Walnut Tree Inn is towards the south of the town.

The Monarch's Way long-distance recreational footpath passes through the town. The town is part of the West Country Carnival circuit.

The nearest railway station is in neighbouring Gillingham, Dorset, on the Exeter to Waterloo line.

Notable people
Edward Henslow (1879–1947), British Army officer and first-class cricketer
Sir Harrison Birtwistle (1934-2022), composer

References

External links
Mere Town Council
Mere Museum
St Michael's Church

 
Towns in Wiltshire
Market towns in Wiltshire
Civil parishes in Wiltshire